Egidio Nkaijanabwo (born 29 August 1935), is a Ugandan Roman Catholic priest who served as Bishop of the Roman Catholic Diocese of Kasese, from 6 March 1989 until 15 April 2014.

Background and priesthood
Nkaijanabwo was born on 29 August 1935 in Rugazi, in present-day Rubirizi District, in the Western Region of Uganda. He was ordained a priest on 28 May 1961, at Liverpool Metropolitan Cathedral, in Liverpool, United Kingdom. He served as priest until 6 March 1989.

As bishop
He was appointed Bishop of Roman Catholic Diocese of Kasese on 6 March 1989	and was consecrated a bishop at Kasese on 17 June 1989 by Cardinal Emmanuel Kiwanuka Nsubuga, Archbishop of the Roman Catholic Archdiocese of Kampala, assisted by Bishop Serapio Bwemi Magambo†, Bishop of Fort Portal and Bishop John Baptist Kakubi†, Bishop of Mbarara.

On 15 April 2014, Bishop Nkaijanabwo retired as bishop and lives on as Bishop Emeritus of Kasese, Uganda.

Succession table at Tororo

References

External links

 Profile of the Roman Catholic Diocese of Kasese

1935 births
Living people
People from Rubirizi District
20th-century Roman Catholic bishops in Uganda
21st-century Roman Catholic bishops in Uganda
Roman Catholic bishops of Kasese